Yarda is a village situated in Tanout Department, Zinder Region, Niger.

References

Zinder Region
Populated places in Niger